Georg Peter Hermann Eggert (3 January 1844 – 12 March 1920) was a German architect. He designed important public buildings such as the Frankfurt Main Station and the New Town Hall in Hannover, often in the style of Neo-Renaissance.

Career 
Born in Burg bei Magdeburg, Eggert studied with Heinrich Strack at the Bauakademie in Berlin.
He built the Frankfurt Main Station from 1883 to 1888, regarded as his most important building.

He participated in the competition for the New Town Hall in Hannover in 1895, won the second competition a year later and was commissioned to build the exterior. From 1898 he worked in his own office in Hannover.

Many of Eggert's designs are in the style of Neo-Renaissance. He was a member of the Prussian Academy of Arts from 1896 in the section  (Arts). Eggert died in Weimar.

Recognition

Many of Eggert's designs are held at the Museum of Architecture of the Technische Universität Berlin. In the central Frankfurt Gallus quarter a section of a street called after Camberg was renamed Hermann-Eggert-Straße in 2009.

Selected works and designs 

 1869: Competition design for the new Berlin Cathedral (not built)
 1872–1877: Ernst Moritz Arndt Tower on Rügen
 1881: Observatory of the Strasbourg University
 1883–1888: Frankfurt Main Station
 1884–1889: Palais du Rhin in Strasbourg
 1898: Hamburg-Altona station (demolished in 1978)
 1898–1899: Tierärztliche Hochschule (Academy of Veterinary Medicine) in Hannover (destroyed in World War II)
 1898–1909: New Town Hall in Hannover
 1899–1902: Annex of the Technical University of Berlin (now Straße des 17. Juni 145)
 1907: Bismarckturm in Burg bei Magdeburg

Literature 
  1905, No 493.
 Alexander Dorner:  Hannover 1931, p. 26.
 Christine Kranz-Michaelis:  }, vol. 4.) Gebr. Mann, Berlin 1982, pp. 395–413.
 Wolfgang Steinweg:  Schlüter, Hannover 1988, p. 38f

References

External links 

 Hermann Eggert Akademie der Künste

19th-century German architects
1844 births
1920 deaths
People from Burg bei Magdeburg
20th-century German architects